Richard Clifford Blackwood (born 15 May 1972) is a British actor, presenter and rapper. Between 2015 and 2018, he played Vincent Hubbard in the BBC soap opera EastEnders. In 2020, he began portraying the role of Felix Westwood in the Channel 4 soap opera Hollyoaks. For his role as Felix, he has been nominated for a TRIC Award and a National Television Award.

Career
Blackwood presented the UK version of Singled Out on Channel 5, and in 1999, he presented his own series, titled The Richard Blackwood Show. He was also a presenter on Top of the Pops and the MTV television show, MTV Select with Donna Air. In 2000, Blackwood had a number three single on the UK Singles Chart with the song "Mama Who Da Man", based on Mama Used to Say by his uncle Junior Giscombe. He later followed it up with two singles, "1.2.3.4 Get with the Wicked" (number 10) and "Someone There for Me" (number 23) and released the album You'll Love to Hate This (number 35) in 2000.

Blackwood appeared on the satire comedy series Brass Eye in 2001, during the episode "Paedogeddon!". Blackwood then had acting appearances in Holby City, and played the title character in the 2002 television series Ed Stone Is Dead. During May 2003, Blackwood appeared in Channel 5's Celebrity Detox Camp, which involved him being filmed "pumping 18 litres of coffee solution through his anus into [his] stomach". In March 2007, he acted in the Bollywood film Don't Stop Dreaming. In 2005, Blackwood appeared in Princes of Comedii DVD release. In 2010, he played Brightie in the Tennessee Williams play Cat on a Hot Tin Roof, alongside Adrian Lester and James Earl Jones at the Novello Theatre in London. In 2011, he played the role of Donkey in the West End production of Shrek the Musical. The show opened at the Theatre Royal Drury Lane on 14 June 2011. Blackwood appeared with the rest of the Shrek cast on Britain's Got Talent for ITV on 31 May 2011. They performed "I'm a Believer".

On 17 January 2015, it was announced that Blackwood would be joining the cast of EastEnders as character Vincent Hubbard. He made his first appearance on 17 February 2015, and his last appearance aired on 20 April 2018. In 2019, Blackwood took part in the eleventh series of Dancing on Ice, partnered with professional skater Carlotta Edwards. They were eliminated in Week 3, following a skate off against Saira Khan and Mark Hanretty. In 2020, it was announced that he would be joining the cast of the Channel 4 soap opera Hollyoaks. Since joining Hollyoaks, Blackwood has been nominated for a TRIC Award for Soap Actor of the Year, as well as a National Television Award for Serial Drama Performance.

Personal life
In a 2000 interview, Blackwood claimed that if he had not made it in show business he would have been "a graphic designer, designing buildings".
He became the step-brother of supermodel Naomi Campbell when his father married her mother in the 1980s, until their divorce several years later. His uncle is singer Junior Giscombe and his cousin is the actor and comedian Vas Blackwood.

Blackwood has said he once attempted suicide after filing for bankruptcy in 2003. He has a son, Keaun, born in January 2001.

Discography

Studio album

Singles

Awards and nominations

References

External links

 

1972 births
20th-century English comedians
21st-century English comedians
English people of Jamaican descent
English radio DJs
Black British radio presenters
English television presenters
English male stage actors
English male soap opera actors
Black British male actors
Black British male rappers
Black British male comedians
English stand-up comedians
English male actors
Comedians from London
People from Clapham
Rappers from London
Living people
Top of the Pops presenters